The 2014 World RX of Turkey was the 11th round of the inaugural season of the FIA World Rallycross Championship. The event was held at Istanbul Park in Tuzla, Istanbul.

Tanner Foust and Ken Block were entered in the event but pulled out on the advice of the American government due to Turkish involvement in the Syrian civil war.

Heats

Semi-finals

Semi-final 1

Semi-final 2

Final

Championship standings after the event

References

External links

|- style="text-align:center"
|width="35%"|Previous race:2014 World RX of Italy
|width="30%"|FIA World Rallycross Championship2014 season
|width="35%"|Next race:2014 World RX of Argentina
|- style="text-align:center"
|width="35%"|Previous race:None
|width="30%"|World RX of Turkey
|width="35%"|Next race:2015 World RX of Turkey
|- style="text-align:center"

Turkey
World RX